Bar Haven, formerly called Barren Island, is a former settlement in the Canadian province of Newfoundland and Labrador. It was located on Bar Haven Island.

The community was depopulated by the government in 1966. In 1956 it had a population of 248.

See also
List of ghost towns in Newfoundland and Labrador

Ghost towns in Newfoundland and Labrador